Oscarellidae is a family of marine sponges.

Genera
 Oscarella Vosmaer, 1884
 Oscarella balibaloi Pérez, Ivanisevic, Dubois, Pedel, Thomas, Tokina & Ereskovsky, 2011
 Oscarella bergenensis Gazave, Lavrov, Cabrol, Renard, Rocher, Vacelet, Adamska, Borchiellini & Ereskovsky, 2013
 Oscarella carmela Muricy & Pearse, 2004
 Oscarella cruenta (Carter, 1876)
 Oscarella filipoi Pérez & Ruiz, 2018
 Oscarella imperialis Muricy, Boury-Esnault, Bézac & Vacelet, 1996
 Oscarella kamchatkensis Ereskovsky, Sanamyan & Vishnyakov, 2009
 Oscarella lobularis (Schmidt, 1862)
 Oscarella malakhovi Ereskovsky, 2006
 Oscarella membranacea Hentschel, 1909
 Oscarella microlobata Muricy, Boury-Esnault, Bézac & Vacelet, 1996
 Oscarella nicolae  Gazave, Lavrov, Cabrol, Renard, Rocher, Vacelet, Adamska, Borchiellini & Ereskovsky, 2013
 Oscarella nigraviolacea Bergquist & Kelly, 2004
 Oscarella ochreacea Muricy & Pearse, 2004
 Oscarella pearsei Ereskovsky, Richter, Lavrov, Schippers & Nichols, 2017
 Oscarella stillans Bergquist & Kelly, 2004
 Oscarella tenuis Hentschel, 1909
 Oscarella tuberculata (Schmidt, 1868)
 Oscarella viridis Muricy, Boury-Esnault, Bézac & Vacelet, 1996
 Oscarella zoranja Pérez & Ruiz, 2018
 Pseudocorticium Boury-Esnault, Muricy, Gallissian & Vacelet, 1995
 Pseudocorticium jarrei Boury-Esnault, Muricy, Gallissian & Vacelet, 1995

References

Homoscleromorpha